Strelci may refer to:
 Strelci, Kičevo, North Macedonia
 Strelci, Markovci, Slovenia